Congeria kusceri is a species of bivalve belonging to the family Dreissenidae.

Per IUCN, the species has the status "vulnerable".

References

Dreissenidae
 Bivalves described in 1962
IUCN Red List vulnerable species